Platystomini is a tribe of fungus weevils in the beetle family Anthribidae. There are 4 genera and over 100 described species in North America, and many others worldwide.

Genera
These genera belong to the tribe Platystomini:
 Alloplius
 Arecopais
 Brachylaenus
 Caenophloeobius
 Doeothena
 Entaphioides
 Epitaphius
 Euciodes
 Euphloeobius
 Exillis Pascoe, 1860
 Gulamentus
 Lawsonia
 Litotropis
 Mentanus
 Mylascopus
 Paraphloeobius
 Parexillis
 Penestica
 Phloeobiopsis
 Phloeobius Schoenherr, 1823
 Phloeomimus
 Phoenicobiella Cockerell, 1906
 Pioenidia
 Platystomos Schneider, 1791
 Toxonotus Lacordaire, 1866
 Tropidobasis

References

Further reading

External links

 

Anthribidae
Articles created by Qbugbot